The 1977–78 NBA season was the 32nd season of the National Basketball Association. The season ended with the Washington Bullets winning the NBA Championship, beating the Seattle SuperSonics 4 games to 3 in the NBA Finals.

Notable occurrences
On October 10, 1977, and in a shocking moment to Knicks fans, the New York Knicks traded Walt Frazier to the Cleveland Cavaliers as compensation for a free agent singing. That free agent the Knicks got was Jim Cleamons.
The New York Nets moved from Uniondale, New York to Piscataway, New Jersey, and were renamed the New Jersey Nets. The New York Knicks, who forced the Nets to pay $4.8 million for invading the New York area prior to the previous season, remained the only NBA team in New York City for 35 years, until the Nets moved to Brooklyn in the 2012–13 season.
The 1978 NBA All-Star Game was played at the Omni Coliseum in Atlanta, with the East beating the West 133–125. Randy Smith of the Buffalo Braves won the game's MVP award.
The defending champion Portland Trail Blazers started with a 50–10 record and looked poised to repeat, but Bill Walton broke his foot and was sidelined for the remainder of the season. The Blazers, hurt by Walton's absence and by other key injuries, faded to an 8–14 finish and lost to the Sonics in the Western Conference semifinals.
On December 9, 1977, Kermit Washington punched Houston Rockets player Rudy Tomjanovich in the face during an NBA game. Tomjanovich sustained serious injuries and missed the rest of the season. The NBA fined Washington $10,000 and suspended him for 26 games.
Throughout the 1977–78 season, CBS broadcast NBA games during the regular season and the playoffs. During halftime of those games, they showed a pre-taped H–O–R–S–E tournament pitting players from the NBA against each other. It featured, among others, Pete Maravich, Paul Westphal, Bob McAdoo, Kevin Grevey, and George Gervin. Maravich and Westphal made it to the final, and CBS originally planned to hold their match at halftime during an NBA Finals game.  However, Maravich was injured and could not participate, so CBS decided to have Westphal compete against "Bag-Man" (who was actually analyst Rick Barry with a bag covering his head) by letting them both shoot a free throw.  Westphal, blindfolded, went first and hit his.  Barry missed, and Westphal was awarded the trophy. The NBA H–O–R–S–E competition would not be re-instituted for 31 more years, returning for the 2009 All-Star Weekend.
 This was the first season since the 1949–50 season that no Boston Celtics player was named to either the First or Second All-NBA Team.
 This was also the last season for longtime Boston Celtics' player John Havlicek, who retired at the end of the season after sixteen years in the NBA all with the legendary franchise.
 Also retiring this season were Dave Bing, Cazzie Russell and George Karl, though Karl would later become an NBA coach.
 With 8 minutes and 43 seconds of the final quarter remaining in the game between the Atlanta Hawks and the Milwaukee Bucks on the 25th of November, the Hawks were leading by 29 points, and looked set for an easy win. The Bucks then outscored the Hawks 35–4 to win the game by two points, 117–115. The Bucks' victory is still the biggest fourth quarter comeback in NBA history.

Final standings

By division

By conference

Notes
z, y – division champions
x – clinched playoff spot

Playoffs
Teams in bold advanced to the next round. The numbers to the left of each team indicate the team's seeding in its conference, and the numbers to the right indicate the number of games the team won in that round. The division champions are marked by an asterisk. Home court advantage does not necessarily belong to the higher-seeded team, but instead the team with the better regular season record; teams enjoying the home advantage are shown in italics.

Statistics leaders

NBA awards
Most Valuable Player: Bill Walton, Portland Trail Blazers
Rookie of the Year: Walter Davis, Phoenix Suns
Coach of the Year: Hubie Brown, Atlanta Hawks

All-NBA First Team:
F – Julius Erving, Philadelphia 76ers
F – Truck Robinson, New Orleans Jazz
C – Bill Walton, Portland Trail Blazers
G – George Gervin, San Antonio Spurs
G – David Thompson, Denver Nuggets

All-NBA Second Team:
F – Walter Davis, Phoenix Suns
F – Maurice Lucas, Portland Trail Blazers
C – Kareem Abdul-Jabbar, Los Angeles Lakers
G – Paul Westphal, Phoenix Suns
G – Pete Maravich, New Orleans Jazz

All-NBA Rookie Team:
Bernard King, New Jersey Nets
Marques Johnson, Milwaukee Bucks
Jack Sikma, Seattle SuperSonics
Norm Nixon, Los Angeles Lakers
Walter Davis, Phoenix Suns

NBA All-Defensive First Team:
Bobby Jones, Denver Nuggets
Maurice Lucas, Portland Trail Blazers
Bill Walton, Portland Trail Blazers
Lionel Hollins, Portland Trail Blazers
Don Buse, Phoenix Suns

NBA All-Defensive Second Team:
E.C. Coleman, Golden State Warriors
Bob Gross, Portland Trail Blazers
Kareem Abdul-Jabbar, Los Angeles Lakers (tie)
Artis Gilmore, Chicago Bulls (tie)
Norm Van Lier, Chicago Bulls
Quinn Buckner, Milwaukee Bucks

References